Maria Esther Andion Bueno (11 October 1939 – 8 June 2018) was a Brazilian professional tennis player. During her 11-year career in the 1950s and 1960s, she won 19 Grand Slam titles (seven in women's singles, 11 in women's doubles, and one in mixed doubles), making her the most successful South American female tennis player in history, and the only one to ever win Wimbledon. Bueno was the year-end number-one ranked female player in 1959 and 1960 and was known for her graceful style of play.

In 1960, Bueno became the first woman ever to win a calendar-year Grand Slam in doubles (all four majors in a year), three of them with Darlene Hard and one with Christine Truman.

Tennis career

Bueno was born in São Paulo. According to her official website, her father, a businessman, was a keen club tennis player. Her elder brother Pedro was also a tennis player. She began playing tennis aged six at the Clube de Regatas Tiete in São Paulo and, without having received any formal training, won her first tournament at age 12. She was 15 when she won her country's women's singles championship. She first went abroad in 1957 at age 17 and won the Orange Bowl juniors tournament in Florida, USA.

Joining the international circuit in 1958, Bueno won the singles title at the Italian Championships. The same year she gained the first of her Grand Slam titles, winning the women's doubles at Wimbledon with Althea Gibson. The following year, Bueno won her first singles title at Wimbledon, defeating Darlene Hard in the final. She also won the singles title at the U.S. Championships after a straight-sets victory in the final against Christine Truman, earning the World No. 1 ranking for 1959 and the Associated Press Female Athlete of the Year award. Bueno was the first non-North-American woman to win both Wimbledon and the U.S. Championships in the same calendar year. In her native Brazil, she returned as a national heroine, honored by the country's president and given a ticker-tape parade on the streets of São Paulo.

According to Lance Tingay of the Daily Telegraph and the Daily Mail and Bud Collins, Bueno was ranked in the world top ten from 1958 through 1960 and from 1962 through 1968, reaching a career high of World No. 1 in those rankings in 1959 and 1960. The International Tennis Hall of Fame also lists her as the top ranked player in 1964 (after losing the final at the French Championships and winning both Wimbledon and the U.S. Championships) and 1966.

Bueno won the singles title at Wimbledon three times and at the U.S. Championships four times. She was a singles finalist at the Australian Championships and the French Championships, losing both finals to Margaret Smith. Bueno reached at least the quarterfinals in each of the first 26 Grand Slam singles tournaments she played. This streak ended at Wimbledon in 1967 when she lost in the fourth round because of an arm injury.

As a doubles player, Bueno won twelve Grand Slam championships with six different partners. In 1960, she became the first woman to win the women's doubles title at all four Grand Slam tournaments in the same calendar year, partnered with Christine Truman at the Australian Championships and Hard at the French Championships, Wimbledon, and the U.S. Championships.

Her playing career was affected by various arm and leg injuries. She played only intermittently after 1968; her final tournament win was the Japan Open in 1974, her only professional win. She retired from playing in 1977.

Her playing style was described as bold and aggressive; she had a hard serve, was a strong volleyer, and often came into the net. Bud Collins described her as "incomparably balletic and flamboyant". She did not use a coach, and attributed her speed on the court to training with men. The American player Billie Jean King acknowledged her as an influence. She was also known for her on-court style, wearing tennis dresses designed by Ted Tinling.

Later career
Bueno worked as a commentator for SporTV, a Brazilian cable television sports channel.

Death
Bueno died on 8 June 2018, aged 78, at a hospital in São Paulo, Brazil, where she had been admitted for mouth cancer. One obituary states she was diagnosed in 2016 with virulent Merkel-cell carcinoma, a rare and highly aggressive skin cancer. A minute's applause in honour of Bueno was held as a tribute before the Women's Singles final at the 2018 French Open the day after her death.

Honours
In 1959 Correios do Brasil issued a postal stamp honouring her title at the Wimbledon Ladies Singles Championships. That same year the Associated Press voted her Female Athlete of the Year. In 1978, Bueno was inducted into the International Tennis Hall of Fame in Newport, Rhode Island.

Bueno was awarded the International Club's prestigious Jean Borotra Sportsmanship Award in 2003.

The Seniors World Team Championships for the women's 50 age category is named "Maria Esther Bueno Cup" by the International Tennis Federation (ITF) in her honour. 
In 2015 the centre court of the Olympic Tennis Centre in Rio de Janeiro was named after her.

In October 2018, Maria Esther Bueno received the Medal of Sporting Merit from the Chamber of Councilors of São Paulo, according to the Resolution 03/2014. The award is instituted within the scope of the Municipality of São Paulo, to be awarded annually to the entity or citizen of São Paulo in recognition of the relevance of services rendered in favor of sport in the Municipality of São Paulo, or that, in any case, have contributed to the aggrandizement of the sport or significantly encourage its practice, whether through personal goals achieved or activity with society.

Grand Slam finals
Bueno won 19 and lost 16 of her Grand Slam finals. This represents a success rate of 54%.

Singles: 12 (7 titles, 5 runners-up)

Doubles: 16 (11 wins, 5 runners-up)

Mixed doubles: 7 (1 win, 6 runners-up)

Grand Slam singles tournament timeline

Note: The Australian Open was held twice in 1977, in January and December.

See also
Performance timelines for all female tennis players who reached at least one Grand Slam final

Notes

References

External links

 
 
 
 

1939 births
2018 deaths
Australian Championships (tennis) champions
Brazilian female tennis players
Brazilian people of Spanish descent
French Championships (tennis) champions
Tennis players from São Paulo
International Tennis Hall of Fame inductees
Tennis players at the 1955 Pan American Games
Tennis players at the 1963 Pan American Games
United States National champions (tennis)
US Open (tennis) champions
Wimbledon champions (pre-Open Era)
Grand Slam (tennis) champions in women's singles
Grand Slam (tennis) champions in women's doubles
Grand Slam (tennis) champions in mixed doubles
Pan American Games medalists in tennis
Pan American Games gold medalists for Brazil
Pan American Games silver medalists for Brazil
Pan American Games bronze medalists for Brazil
Deaths from cancer in São Paulo (state)
Deaths from Merkel-cell carcinoma
World number 1 ranked female tennis players